Dana Ann Remus is an American lawyer who served as White House counsel for U.S. President Joe Biden from January 2021 to July 2022. Prior to her appointment as White House counsel, Remus was general counsel for Joe Biden's 2020 presidential campaign.  Earlier in her career, she was deputy assistant to the president and deputy counsel for ethics during the presidency of Barack Obama, was general counsel for the Obama Foundation from 2017 to 2019, and was counsel to Michelle Obama.

Early life and education

Dana Remus was born in New Hampshire and raised in the town of Bedford. She earned a Bachelor of Arts degree in East Asian studies from Harvard University in 1997 and a Juris Doctor from Yale Law School in 2002.

Career
After graduating from law school, Remus clerked for Judge Anthony Scirica of the United States Court of Appeals for the Third Circuit. In 2008, she clerked for Justice Samuel Alito of the Supreme Court of the United States. She eventually joined Cravath, Swaine & Moore. In 2006, she began her academic career as an inaugural faculty member at the newly established  Drexel University College of Law (now Thomas R. Kline School of Law).  She also taught at the University of New Hampshire School of Law and property law and judicial and legal ethics at the University of North Carolina School of Law.

Remus joined the Obama administration, serving as Deputy Assistant to the President and Deputy Counsel for Ethics. After Obama left office, Remus joined the Obama Foundation as general counsel and also served as counsel to Michelle Obama. She left the Foundation in 2019 to become general counsel for the Joe Biden 2020 presidential campaign.

Biden administration
Remus was named White House counsel on November 17, 2020. She left her position in July 2022 and was replaced by Stuart F. Delery.

Personal life
Dana Remus is married to Brett M. Holmgren, who serves as the Assistant Secretary of State for Intelligence and Research in the Biden administration. The wedding took place on January 21, 2018, in Washington, D.C., with former President Barack Obama officiating. The couple have one son.

See also 
 List of law clerks of the Supreme Court of the United States (Seat 8)

References

External links
Dana Remus profile (Archived 1/11/2021) from the Biden-Harris Transition 

21st-century American women lawyers
21st-century American lawyers
Living people
Biden administration personnel
Law clerks of the Supreme Court of the United States
Harvard University alumni
Obama administration personnel
University of North Carolina faculty
White House Counsels
Yale Law School alumni
Year of birth missing (living people)